Celestino Santana Francisco Alvares (1 August 1920 – 28 February 1999) popularly known by his stage name C. Alvares, was an Indian actor, playwright, singer, producer and director from Saligao, Goa.

Career 
Alvares specialised in composing and singing poignant duets on various social issues and for this reason, he was called the "King of Duets". He acted in two of the most memorable Konkani films, including Amchem Noxib, Nirmon, Mhoji Ghorkarn, Bhuierantlo Munis  and Uddta to Buddta. He received the award for best actor for Nirmon, while the film itself won a National Award.

Alvares is credited with renewing the trend of female participation on the Konkani stage. He encouraged the  maximum number of girls who succeeded in earning a reputation for themselves as actresses.  Actresses whom he introduced on the Konkani stage were Shalini Mardolkar, Filomena Braz, CarmensRose, Cecilia (Albuquerque) Machado, Antonette Mendes, Miss Mohana Cabral, Ophelia Cabral, Jessie Dias and Betty Fernandes.

Alvares has written 107 tiatrs besides acting in thousands of tiatrs during the span of 60 years that he served the tiatr stage. Because of his lifelong work, he has been called the greatest contributor to the konkani stage. He also produced the Konkani film Faxi Mogachi.

References

External links
 

Singers from Goa
Konkani-language singers
1999 deaths
1920 births
Tiatrists
20th-century Indian male singers
20th-century Indian singers
Male actors from Goa
Writers from Goa
Film directors from Goa
20th-century Indian dramatists and playwrights
20th-century Indian male actors
20th-century Indian film directors
Indian male film actors